Guilherme  is a Portuguese given name, equivalent to William in English. The feminine form of this name is Guilhermina. Diminutive forms include Guilhermino. Vilma (Portuguese form of Wilma) is another female variant of the name.

Brazilian footballers
Guilherme Alecsander Machado Guedes (born 1991), who last played for Marist
Guilherme Alvim Marinato (born 1985), who currently plays for Lokomotiv Moscow
Guilherme Augusto Vieira dos Santos (born 1995), forward
Guilherme Borges (born 1999), midfielder 
Guilherme Camacho (born 1990), who currently plays for Corinthians
Guilherme de Cássio Alves (born 1974), retired striker
Guilherme Conceição Cardoso (born 1983), who is currently on loan to Vitória, from Cruzeiro
Guilherme Costa Marques (born 1991), who currently plays for Legia Warsaw
Guilherme Finkler (born 1985), who currently plays for Wellington Phoenix FC
Guilherme Haubert Sityá (born 1990), left back
Guilherme Lopes de Almeida (born 2002), left back
Guilherme Mascarenhas Santana (born August 1990), midfielder
Guilherme Mendes Ribeiro (born 2000), forward
Guilherme Milhomem Gusmão (born 1988), who currently plays for Atlético Mineiro
Guilherme Oliveira Santos (born 1988), who currently plays for Valladolid
Guilherme de Paula Lucrécio (born 1986), who currently plays for Milsami Orhei
Guilherme do Prado (born 1981), who last played for Chicago Fire
Guilherme Schettine Guimarães (born 1995), who currently plays for Santa Clara
Guilherme Siqueira (born 1986), retired Brazilian left back
Guilherme Soares Guedes de Freitas (born 1999), who currently plays for Grêmio
Guilherme Teixeira (born 1992) Brazilian footballer
Guilherme Vinícius Quichini dos Santos (born 1993), who currently plays for Famalicão

Other
Guilherme de Brito
Guilherme Berenguer, Brazilian TV actor
Guilherme Weber
Guilherme Posser da Costa, prime minister of São Tomé and Príncipe
Guilherme Samaia, Brazilian racing driver

Portuguese masculine given names